The Islamic National Army or referred to as the Islamic Emirate Army and Afghan Army, is the land force branch of the Afghan Armed Forces. The roots of an army in Afghanistan can be traced back to the early 18th century when the Hotak dynasty was established in Kandahar followed by Ahmad Shah Durrani's rise to power. It was reorganized in 1880 during Emir Abdur Rahman Khan's reign. Afghanistan remained neutral during the First and Second World Wars. From the 1960s to the early 1990s, the Afghan Army was equipped by the Soviet Union.

After the resignation of President Najibullah in 1992, the army effectively dissolved. In 1996 the Islamic Emirate of Afghanistan (Taliban regime) took power, creating their own army, which lasted until United States invasion of Afghanistan in October–November 2001.

By 2016, most of Afghanistan came under government control. However over the next few years the government slowly lost territory to the Taliban and eventually collapsed, with Kabul falling to the Taliban in 2021. The majority of training of the ANA was undertaken in the Kabul Military Training Centre. In 2019, the ANA had approximately 180,000 soldiers out of an authorized strength of 195,000. Despite its significant manpower on paper, in reality a significant portion of the Afghan National Army manpower were made up of ghost soldiers.

Following the withdrawal of U.S. and allied troops from Afghanistan in the Summer of 2021, in the face of a rapid Taliban offensive, the Afghan National Army largely disintegrated. Following the escape of President Ashraf Ghani and the fall of Kabul, remaining ANA soldiers either deserted their posts or surrendered to the Taliban. Some ANA remnants reportedly joined the anti-Taliban National Resistance Front of Afghanistan in the Panjshir Valley (see Republican insurgency in Afghanistan).

History

The Royal Afghan Army 

Historically, Afghans have served in the army of the Ghaznavids (963–c.1187), Ghurids (1148–1215), Delhi Sultanate (1206–1527), and the Mughals (1526–1858). The Afghan National Army traces its origin to the early 18th century when the Hotak dynasty rose to power in Kandahar and defeated the Persian Safavid Empire at the Battle of Gulnabad in 1722.

When Ahmad Shah Durrani formed the Durrani Empire in 1747, in general, tribes were responsible for providing troops to the king. The only national army that existed during Ahmad Shah's time consisted of small groups that functioned as royal bodyguards. The Afghan Army fought a number of battles in the Punjab region of India during the 19th century. One of the famous battles was the 1761 Battle of Panipat in which the Afghan army decisively defeated the Hindu Maratha Empire. The Afghans then fought with the Sikh Empire, until finally, the Sikh Marshal Hari Singh Nalwa died and Sikh conquests stopped. In 1839, the British successfully invaded Afghanistan and installed the exiled Shah Shujah Durrani into power. Their occupation of Afghanistan was challenged after Dost Mohammad's son, Wazir Akbar Khan and the forces he led revolted against the occupying British. By October 1841 disaffected Afghan tribes were flocking to the support of Wazir Akbar Khan in Bamian. The success of Akbar Khan's uprising led to the 1842 retreat from Kabul where the Afghan army decimated British forces, thanks to effective use of the rugged terrain and weapons such as the Jezail.

At the outbreak of the Second Anglo-Afghan War (1878–80), Ali Ahmad Jalali cites sources saying that the regular army was about 50,000 strong and consisted of 62 infantry and 16 cavalry regiments, with 324 guns mostly organized in horse and mountain artillery batteries. Jalali writes that '..although Amir Shir Ali Khan (1863–78) is widely credited for founding the modern Afghan Army, it was only under Abdur Rahman that it became a viable and effective institution.' The Library of Congress Country Study for Afghanistan states that when Abdur Rahman came to the throne [c.1880]:

"..the army was virtually nonexistent. With the assistance of a liberal financial loan from the British, plus their aid in the form of weapons, ammunition, and other military supplies, [Abdur Rahman] began a 20-year task of creating a respectable regular force by instituting measures that formed the long-term basis of the military system. These included increasing the equalization of military obligation by setting up a system known as the hasht nafari (whereby one man in every eight between the ages of 20 and 40 took his turn at military service); constructing an arsenal in Kabul to reduce dependence on foreign sources for small arms and other ordnance; introducing supervised training courses; organizing troops into divisions, brigades, and regiments, including battalions of artillery; developing pay schedules; and introducing an elementary (and harsh) disciplinary system.

Further improvements to the Army were made by King Amanullah Khan in the early 20th century just before the Third Anglo-Afghan War. King Amanullah fought against the British in 1919, resulting in Afghanistan becoming fully independent after the Treaty of Rawalpindi was signed. It appears from reports of Naib Sular Abdur Rahim's career that a Cavalry Division was in existence in the 1920s, with him being posted to the division in Herat Province in 1913 and Mazar-i-Sharif after 1927. A military academy was in existence by Amanullah's reign. The Army fought the Soviet Union in 1925–1926. In 1927 Afghanistan invited Turkey to send a military advisory mission, resulting in a strengthening of Afghan divisions and brigades, "augmenting each echelon headquarters with supporting staff;" and "regularizing the officer corps." The Afghan Army was expanded during King Zahir Shah's reign, starting in 1933.

From 1949–1950 to 1961, Afghanistan-Pakistan skirmishes took place along the frontier, culminating in fighting in Bajaur Agency in September 1960. This led to a breakoff in diplomatic relations between the two countries in September 1961.

In 1953, Lieutenant General Mohammed Daoud Khan, cousin of the King who had previously served as Minister of Defence, was transferred from command of the Central Corps in Kabul to become Prime Minister of Afghanistan. The Central Corps was headquartered at Amanullah's Darulaman Palace. On the opening day of Parliament in October 1965, a violent student demonstration among which Babrak Karmal was at the forefront forced Zahir Shah's new prime minister Yousef to resign. Two students were killed when the new corps commander, General Abdul Wali, sent in troops to restore order.

From the 1960s to the early 1990s, the Afghan Army received training and equipment mostly from the Soviet Union. In February – March 1957, the first group of Soviet military specialists (about 10, including interpreters) was sent to Kabul to train Afghan officers and non-commissioned officers. At the time, there seems to have been significant Turkish influence in the Afghan Armed Forces, which waned quickly after the Soviet advisors arrived. By the late 1950s, Azimi describes three corps, each with a number of divisions, along the eastern border with Pakistan and several independent divisions.

In the early 1970s, Soviet military assistance was increased. The number of Soviet military specialists increased from 1,500 in 1973 to 5,000 by April 1978. The senior Soviet specialist at this time (from 29 November 1972 until 11 December 1975) was a Major General I.S. Bondarets (И.С. Бондарец), and from 1975 to 1978, the senior Soviet military adviser was Major General L.N. Gorelov. Before the 1978 Saur Revolution, according to Jacobs, the army included three armored divisions; infantry divisions .. averaging 4,500 to 8,000 men each; "two mountain infantry brigades, one artillery brigade, a guards regiment (for palace protection), three artillery regiments, two commando regiments, and a parachute battalion, which was largely grounded. All the formations were under the control of three corps level headquarters. All but three infantry divisions were facing Pakistan along a line from Bagram south to Khandahar." There were 570 medium tanks plus more Soviet T-55s on order.

Socialist Afghanistan 

On 27 April 1978 the People's Democratic Party of Afghanistan, led by Nur Mohammad Taraki, Babrak Karmal and Amin overthrew the regime of Mohammad Daoud, who was killed the next day, along with most of his family. On 1 May, Taraki became President, Prime Minister and General Secretary of the PDPA. The country was then renamed the Democratic Republic of Afghanistan (DRA), and the PDPA regime lasted until April 1992.

The army lost much of its strength during the early stages of PDPA rule. One of the main reasons for the small size was that the Soviet military were afraid the Afghan army would defect en masse to the enemy if total personnel increased. There were several sympathisers of the mujahideen within the military. Even so, there were several elite units under the command of the Afghan army, for instance, the 26th Airborne Battalion, 444th, 37th and 38th Commando Brigades. The 26th Airborne Battalion proved politically unreliable, and in 1980 they revolted against the PDPA government. The Commando Brigades were, in contrast, considered reliable and were used as mobile strike forces until they sustained excessive casualties. Insurgents ambushed and inflicted heavy casualties on the 38th Commando Brigade during the Second Battle of Zhawar in Paktika Province in May 1983. After sustaining heavy casualties the commando brigades were turned into battalions.

Most soldiers were recruited for a three-year term, later extended to four-year terms in 1984.

After the PDPA seizure of power, desertions swept the force, affecting the loyalty and moral values of soldiers. There were purges on patriotic junior and senior officers, and upper class Afghan aristocrats in society. On March 15, 1979, the Herat uprising broke out. The 17th Division was detailed by the regime to put down the rebellion, but this proved a mistake, as there were few Khalqi faction soldiers in the division and instead it mutinied and joined the uprising. Forces from Kabul had to be dispatched to suppress the rebellion.

Gradually the Army's three armoured divisions and now sixteen infantry divisions dropped in size to on average around 2,500 strong, quarter strength, by 1985. One of the first series of defections occurred in the 9th Division, which, Urban wrote, defected by brigades in response to the Soviet intervention. It lost its 5th Brigade at Asmar in August 1979 and its 30th Mountain Brigade in 1980. After Soviet advisors arrived in 1977, they inspired a number of adaptations and reorganisations. In April 1982, the 7th Division was moved from the capital. The division, which was commanded by Khalqi Major General Zia-Ud-Din, had its depleted combat resources spread out along the Kabul-Kandahar highway. In 1984–1985, all infantry divisions were restructured to a common design. In 1985 Army units were relieved of security duties, making more available for combat operations.

During the 1980s Soviet–Afghan War, the Army fought against the mujahideen rebel groups. Deserters or defectors became a severe problem. The Afghan Army's casualties were as high as 50–60,000 soldiers and another 50,000 soldiers deserted the Army. The Afghan Army's defection rate was about 10,000 soldiers per year between 1980 and 1989; the average deserters left the Afghan Army after the first five months.

Local militias were also important to the Najibullah regime's security efforts. From 1988 several new divisions were formed from former Regional Forces/militias' formations: the 53rd Infantry Division – the "Jowzyani militia" of Abdul Rashid Dostum, the 55th, 80th, 93rd, 94th, 95th, and 96th, plus, possibly, a division in Lashkar Gah.

As compensation for the withdrawal of Soviet troops in 1989, the USSR agreed to deliver sophisticated weapons to the regime, among which were large quantities of Scud surface-to-surface missiles. The first 500 were transferred during the early months of 1989, and soon proved to be a critical strategic asset. During the mujahideen attack against Jalalabad, between March and June 1989, three firing batteries manned by Afghan crews advised by Soviets fired approximately 438 missiles. Soon Scuds were in use in all the heavily contested areas of Afghanistan. After January 1992, the Soviet advisors were withdrawn, reducing the Afghan Army's ability to use their ballistic missiles. On April 24, 1992, the mujahideen forces of Ahmad Shah Massoud captured the main Scud stockpile at Afshur (Afshar, Kabul?). As the communist government collapsed, the few remaining Scuds and their Transporter erector launchers were divided among the rival factions fighting for power. However, the lack of trained personnel prevented a sustained use of such weapons, and, between April 1992 and 1996, only 44 Scuds were fired in Afghanistan.

1992 and after 
In spring 1992, the Afghan Army consisted of five corps – 1st Corps at Jalalabad, 2nd at Khandahar, 3rd Corps at Gardez, 4th Corps at Herat, and 6th Corps at Kunduz – as well as five smaller operations groups, including one at Charikar, which had been 5th Corps until it was reduced in status. 1st, 2nd, and 3rd Corps, and the operations groups at Sarobi and Khost, nearly completely disintegrated in 1992. Formations in and around Kabul joined different mujahideen militias while forces in the north and west remained intact for a longer period. Forces in the north and west were taken over by three major commanders: Ismael Khan, Ahmed Shah Masoud, and Abdul Rashid Dostam.

On 18 April 1992, the PDPA garrison at Kunduz surrendered to local mujahideen commanders. The 54th Division base at Kunduz was handed over to the overall military leader of Ittehad in the area, Amir Chughay. Dostum and commanders loyal to him formed Junbesh I-Melli, the National Islamic Movement of Afghanistan. The NIM grouped the former regime's 18th, 20th, 53rd, 54th, and 80th Divisions, plus several brigades. By mid-1994 there were two parallel 6th Corps operating in the north. Dostum's 6th Corps was based at Pul-i-Khumri and had three divisions. The Defence Ministry of the Kabul government's 6th Corps was based at Kunduz and also had three divisions, two sharing numbers with formations in Dostum's corps. By 1995 Masoud controlled three corps commands: the Central Corps at Kabul, the best organised with a strength of 15–20,000, the 5th Corps at Herat covering the west, and the 6th Corps at Kunduz covering the northeast.

By 1996 the Taliban Islamic Emirate of Afghanistan seized the country, aiming to control it by Islamic Sharia law. The Taliban's army and commanders placed emphasis on simplicity; some were secretly trained by the Pakistan Inter-Services Intelligence and Pakistani Armed Forces around the Durand Line.
After the removal of the Taliban government through the United States invasion of Afghanistan in late 2001, private armies loyal to warlords gained more and more influence. In mid-2001, Ali Ahmed Jalali wrote:

The army (as a state institution, organized, armed, and commanded by the state) does not exist in Afghanistan today. Neither the Taliban-led "Islamic Emirate of Afghanistan" nor the "Islamic State of Afghanistan" headed by the ousted President Rabbani has the political legitimacy or administrative efficiency of a state. The militia formations they command are composed of odd assortments of armed groups with varying level of loyalties, political commitment, professional skills, and organizational integrity. Many of them feel free to switch sides, shift loyalties, and join or leave the group spontaneously. The country suffers from the absence of a top political layer capable of controlling individual and group violence. ... Although both sides identify their units with military formations of the old regime, there is hardly any organizational or professional continuity from the past. But these units really exist in name only ... [i]n fact only their military bases still exist, accommodating and supporting an assortment of militia groups.

Formations in existence by the end of 2002 included the 1st Army Corps (Nangarhar), 2nd Army Corps (Kandahar, dominated by Gul Agha Sherzai), 3rd Army Corps (Paktia, where the US allegedly attempted to impose Atiqullah Ludin as commander), 4th Army Corps (Herat, dominated by Ismail Khan), 6th Army Corps at Kunduz, 7th Army Corps (under Atta Muhammad Nur at Balkh), 8th Army Corps (at Jowzjan, dominated by Dostum's National Islamic Movement of Afghanistan) and the Central Army Corps around Kabul. In addition, there were divisions with strong links to the centre in Kabul. These included the 1st in Kabul, 27th in Qalat, 31st in Kabul, 34th in Bamiyan (4th Corps), 36th in Logar, 41st in Ghor, 42nd in Wardak, 71st in Farah, and 100th in Laghman.

The International Crisis Group wrote:

New divisions and even army corps were created to recognise factional realities or undermine the power base of individual commanders, often without regard to the troop levels normally associated with such units. For example, the ministry in July 2002 recognised a 25th Division in Khost province, formed by the Karzai-appointed governor, Hakim Taniwal, to unseat a local warlord, Padshah Khan Zadran, who was then occupying the governor's residence. At its inception, however, the division had only 700 men – the size of a battalion.

Even by December 2004 Human Rights Watch was still saying in an open letter to Karzai that: "Abdul Rabb al-Rasul Sayyaf, the head of the Ittihad-i Islami faction and the Daw'at-e Islami party [should be curbed]. Sayyaf has no government post but has used his power over the Supreme Court and other courts across the country to curtail the rights of journalists, civic society activists, and even political candidates. He also controls militias, including forces recognized as the 10th Division of the Afghan army, which intimidate and abuse Afghans even inside Kabul. We ask that you express public opposition to Sayyaf's activities, explicitly state your opposition to such misuse of unofficial authority, and move expeditiously to disarm and demobilize armed forces associated with Ittihad-i Islami and other unofficial forces."

Afghan National Army (2002–2021) 

During the Bonn Conference on Afghanistan in early December 2001, President Hamid Karzai issued a decree reestablishing a unified army, the Afghan National Army. The decree set a size target of 70,000 (by 2009) and laid out the planned army structure. There had been significant disagreement over the size of the army that was needed. A Ministry of Defense-issued paper said that at least 200,000 active troops were needed. The Afghan Ministry of Defence loudly objected to the smaller, volunteer, nature of the new army, a change from the previous usage of conscripts. The US also blocked the new government from using the army to pressure Pakistan.

The first new Afghan kandak (battalion) was trained by British Army personnel of the International Security Assistance Force (ISAF), becoming 1st Battalion, Afghan National Guard. Yet while the British troops provided high quality training, they were few in number. After some consideration, it was decided that the United States might be able to provide the training. Thus follow-on kandaks were recruited and trained by 1st Battalion, 3rd Special Forces Group. 3rd SFG built the training facilities and ranges for early use, using a Soviet built facility on the eastern side of Kabul, near the then ISAF headquarters.

Recruiting and training began in May 2002, with a difficult but successful recruitment process of bringing hundreds of new recruits in from all parts of Afghanistan. Training was initially done in Pashto and Dari (Persian dialect) and some Arabic due to the very diverse ethnicities. The original US target in April 2002 was that of 12,000 men trained by April 2003, but it was quickly realised that this was too ambitious, and the requirement reduced to only 9,000, to be ready by November 2003. The first female Afghan parachutist Khatol Mohammadzai, trained during the 1980s, became the first female general in the Afghan National Army in August 2002.
The National Military Academy of Afghanistan, a West Point analogue and part of the Marshal Fahim National Defense University based in Qargha Garrison, was also established to produce officers. The NMAA administered a four-year military and civil training programme with the aim of preparing the prospective officer for the long-term. The NMAA taught four major foreign languages, vital to developing the relationship between the ANA and foreign armies.

The U.S. Army's major objectives for the ANA in October 2002 were:
 Ensure activation of Central Corps headquarters and its three Brigades by 1 October 2003
 Develop and begin implementation of Afghan MoD/General Staff reform plan
 Establish ANA institutional support systems including officer and NCO schools, ANA training and doctrine directorate, and garrison support elements
 Design and build Office of Military Cooperation-Afghanistan (OMC-A) ..consisting of US/Coalition military, contractor, and Afghan civilian and military personnel capable of managing the ANA building program as it increases in scope and complexity
 Increase international and Afghan domestic support for and confidence in ANA through the maintenance of quality within the force and the conduct of effective information operations.

The first deployment outside Kabul was made by 3rd Kandak ANA to Paktika Province, including Orgun, in January 2003. By January 2003 just over 1,700 soldiers in five Kandaks (battalions) had completed the 10-week training course, and by mid-2003 a total of 4,000 troops had been trained. Approximately 1,000 ANA soldiers were deployed in the US-led Operation Warrior Sweep, marking the first major combat operation for Afghan troops. Initial recruiting problems lay in the lack of cooperation from regional warlords and inconsistent international support. The problem of desertion dogged the force from the outset: in the summer of 2003, the desertion rate was estimated to be 10% and in mid-March 2004, an estimate suggested that 3,000 soldiers had deserted. Some recruits were under 18 years of age and many could not read or write. Recruits who only spoke the Pashto language experienced difficulty because instruction was usually given through interpreters who spoke Dari.

The Afghan New Beginnings Programme (ANBP) was launched on 6 April 2003 and begin disarmament of former Army personnel in October 2003. In March 2004, fighting between two local militias took place in the western Afghan city of Herat. It was reported that Mirwais Sadiq (son of warlord Ismail Khan) was assassinated in unclear circumstances. Thereafter a bigger conflict began that resulted in the death of up to 100 people. The battle was between troops of Ismail Khan and Abdul Zahir Nayebzada, a senior local military commander blamed for the death of Sadiq. Nayebzada commanded the 17th Herat Division of the Afghan Militia Forces' 4th Corps. In response to the fighting, about 1,500 newly trained ANA soldiers were sent to Herat in order to bring the situation under control.

In addition to the fighting units, establishment of regional structures began when four of the five planned corps commanders and some of their staff were appointed on 1 September 2004. The first regional command was established in Kandahar on September 19; the second at Gardez on September 22, with commands at Mazar-i-Sharif and Herat planned.  The Gardez command, also referred to in the AFPS story as the 203 Corps, was to have an initial force of 200 soldiers. Kandahar's command was the first activated, followed by Gardez and Mazar-e-Sharif. The Herat command was seemingly activated on 28 September. The next year, the ANA's numbers grew to around 20,000 soldiers, most of which were trained by the United States Army. In the meantime, the United States Army Corps of Engineers started building new military camps for the fast-growing army.

In 2003, the United States issued guidelines to ensure the army's ethnic balance. By late 2012, the ANA was composed of 43% Pashtuns, 32% Tajiks, 12% Hazaras, 8% Uzbeks, and the rest were smaller ethnic groups of Afghanistan. However, the army did not track the actual ethnic composition of the officer corps. There were no quotas for the enlisted soldiers.

By March 2011, a National Military Command Center had been established in Kabul, which was being mentored by personnel from the Virginia Army National Guard.

Costs and salaries 
Under the US–Afghanistan Strategic Partnership Agreement, the United States designated Afghanistan as a major non-NATO ally and agreed to fund the ANA until at least 2024. This included soldiers' salaries, providing training and weapons, and all other military costs.

Soldiers in the Army initially received $30 a month during training and $50 a month upon graduation, though the basic pay for trained soldiers later rose to $165. This starting salary increased to $230 a month in an area with moderate security issues and to $240 in those provinces where there was heavy fighting. About 95% of the men and women who served in the military were paid by electronic funds transfer. Special biometrics were used during the registration of each soldier.

Training and International Partnerships 

Task Force Phoenix was the initial U.S. and allied force training organisation in 2002. This program was formalized in April 2003, based near the Kabul Military Training Center. Coalition efforts were initially overseen by OMC-A, then Office of Security Cooperation-Afghanistan, then from 2006 to 2009, by the Combined Security Transition Command – Afghanistan (CSTC-A), a three-star level multi-national command headquartered in downtown Kabul. On the Afghan side, by 2011 all training and education in the Army was run by Afghan National Army Training Command, a two-star command which reported directly to the Chief of the General Staff. All training centers and military schools were under this command.

Individual basic training was conducted primarily by Afghan instructors and staff at the Kabul Military Training Center, situated on the eastern edge of Kabul. The United States Department of Defense assisted in basic and advanced training of enlisted recruits, and also ran the Drill Instructor School which ran basic training courses for training NCOs. Basic training had been expanded to include required literacy courses for illiterate recruits. A French Army advisory team oversaw the training of officers for staff and platoon or toli (company) command in a combined commissioning/infantry officer training unit called the Officer Training Brigade (OTB). OTB candidates in the platoon and company command courses were usually former militia and mujaheddin leaders with various levels of military experience. The United Kingdom also conducted initial infantry officer training and commissioning at the Officer Candidate School (OCS). OCS candidates were young men with little or no military experience. The British Army also conducted initial and advanced Non-Commissioned Officer training as well in a separate NCO Training Brigade.

The Canadian Forces supervised the Combined Training Exercise portion of initial military training, where trainee soldiers, NCOs, and officers were brought together in field training exercises at the platoon, toli (company) and kandak (battalion) levels to certify them ready for field operations. In the Regional Corps, Coalition Embedded Training Teams continued to mentor the kandak's leadership, and advised them in the areas of intelligence, communications, fire support, logistics and infantry tactics.

During the ISAF era, advisers in the US Embedded Training Teams and NATO Operational Mentor and Liaison Teams acted as liaisons between the Afghan Army and coalition forces. The teams coordinated planning and ensured that ANA units received U.S./Coalition support.

Formal education and professional development was conducted at two main ANATC schools, both in Kabul. The National Military Academy of Afghanistan, located near the Kabul International Airport, was a four-year military university which produced degree second lieutenants in a variety of military professions. NMAA's first cadet class entered its second academic year in spring 2006. A contingent of US and Turkish instructors jointly mentored the NMAA faculty and staff. The Command and General Staff College, located in southern Kabul, prepared mid-level ANA officers to serve on brigade and corps staffs. France established the CGSC in early 2004, and a cadre of French Army instructors continued to oversee operations at the school.

Sizable numbers of Afghan National Army Officers were sent to be trained in India either at the Indian Military Academy in Dehradun, the National Defence Academy near Pune or the Officers Training Academy in Chennai. The Indian Military Academy which had been in existence since 1932, provided a four-year degree to ANA army officers, while the National Defence Academy provided a 3-year degree after which officers underwent a one-year specialization in their respective service colleges. The Officers Training Academy provided a 49-week course to Graduate officer candidates.  In 2014 the number of Afghan officers in training in India was nearly 1100.

In October 2007, ANA international partners said they had seen progress and were pleased with Afghan performance in recent exercises. Colonel Thomas McGrath estimated that the ANA would be capable of carrying out independent brigade-size operations by the spring of 2008. Despite high hopes, four years after McGrath's estimated date for independent brigade-sized operations, not a single one of the ANA's 180 kandaks could carry out independent operations, much less an entire brigade. On July 30, 2013, US Acting Assistant Secretary of Defense Peter Lavoy told reporters in Washington, D.C., according to Jane's Defence Weekly, that '... a residual [US] force would be needed to help the ANSF complete more mundane tasks such as logistics, ensuring soldiers get their paychecks, procuring food, awarding fuel contracts, and more.' Lavoy noted that the Afghans were still developing those skills and it would be "well beyond the 2014 date" before they were expected to be capable.

An increasing number of female soldiers joined. By early 2013, reports stated that there were 200,000 ANA troops. However, the Special Inspector General for Afghanistan Reconstruction said in January 2013 that "Determining ANSF strength is fraught with challenges. US and coalition forces rely on the Afghan forces to report their own personnel strength numbers. ..[T]he Combined Security Transition Command-Afghanistan.. noted that.. there is "no viable method of validating [the ANA's] personnel numbers." It was reported in 2016 that the Afghan National Army had close to 1,000 officers with the rank of general, more than the number of generals in the United States Army.

Ineffectiveness 

The ANA was plagued by poor cohesion, illiteracy, corruption and abuse. A quarter of ANA troops were reported to have deserted in 2009 with many troops hiding in the heat of battle rather than engaging the enemy. It was reported that approximately 90% of ANA troops were illiterate and there were widespread instances of corruption with the ANA manpower consisting a high percentage of ghost battalions. Another significant problem for the ANA was a high level of drug abuse amongst its soldiers. The Special Investigator General for Afghan Reconstruction reported the number of ANA soldiers using drugs was "at least 50 percent" and may be as high as 75 percent of all Afghan soldiers, according to some reports.

Many officers held loyalties with particular political factions. The endemic corruption of those officers eroded the army's morale.

Theft and a lack of discipline plagued many elements of the ANA. US trainers reported missing vehicles, weapons and other military equipment, and outright theft of fuel provided by the US to the ANA. Death threats had been leveled against some US officers who tried to stop Afghan soldiers from stealing. Some Afghan soldiers often found improvised explosive devices and snipped the command wires instead of marking them and waiting for US forces to come to detonate them. The practice allowed insurgents to return and reconnect them. US trainers frequently had to remove the cell phones from Afghan soldiers hours before a mission for fear that the operation would be compromised by bragging, gossip and reciprocal warnings.

At times ANA troops attacked their own troops and foreign troops of ISAF. Fragging had worsened enough to the point where two decrees were issued by the Department of Defense in the summer of 2012 stating that all American personnel serving in Afghanistan were told to carry a magazine with their weapon at all times, and that when a group of American troops were present and on duty with ANA forces, one American serviceman had to stand apart on guard with a loaded weapon ready. In addition to fragging, a report by a US inspector general revealed 5,753 cases of "gross human rights abuses by Afghan forces", including "routine enslavement and rape of underage boys (Bacha bazi) by Afghan commanders". The ineffectiveness of the ANA became most apparent during the 2021 Taliban offensive; thousands of ANA troops surrendered to the Taliban en masse, with many cities falling to the Taliban unopposed.

Structure 2002–2021 

A January 2011 NATO Training Mission-Afghanistan information paper described the ANA as being led by the Chief of General Staff, supervising the Vice Chief of the General Staff, the Vice Chief of the Armed Forces (an Air Force officer), the Director of the General Staff, himself supervising the General Staff itself, and seven major commands. The ANA Ground Force Command, under a lieutenant general, directed the regional ground forces corps and the 111th Capital Division. Amongst support facilities was the Chimtallah National Ammunition Depot.

Corps and other major commands 

At its largest the Afghan National Army had seven corps; each corps was responsible for an area of the country. Establishment of the corps started when four regional commands were established with some staff in September 2004. For a period the Afghan National Army Air Corps was also among the corps, before being split off as a separate air force. Each corps had three to four subordinate brigades, and each brigade had four infantry Kandaks (battalions) as basic fighting units. Each infantry kandak was assigned a specific area for which it is responsible for; the Kandak's mission was to secure its area from internal and external threats.

Originally, the four outlying corps were assigned one or two brigades, with the majority of the manpower of the Army based in Kabul's 201st Corps. This was superseded by a buildup in which each corps added extra brigades. Originally, the 2008 Combined Security Transition Command – Afghanistan size target was for a total of 14 brigades: 13 infantry, one mechanized, and one commando.

In 2019–2021 the regionally focused corps were as follows:
 201st Corps (Kabul) – 1st Brigade was based at the Presidential Palace. 3rd Brigade, at Pol-e-Chakri, was to be a mechanised formation including M-113s and Soviet-built main battle tanks (T-62s). In early 2008 LongWarJournal.org placed most of the 3rd Brigade at Jalalabad, 2nd Brigade at Pol-e-Charkhi, and only a single kandak of 1st Brigade at the Presidential Palace. The corps area of responsibility included Eastern Afghanistan, including Kabul, Logar, Kapisa, Konar, and Laghman provinces. This included Kabul as well as vital routes running north and south, and valleys leading from the Pakistani border into Afghanistan.
 203rd Corps (Gardez) The original Gardez Regional Command was established on 23 September 2004. As of 2009, First Brigade, Khost, Second Brigade, Forward Operating Base Rushmore, Sharana, Paktika Province, Third Brigade, Ghazni. On 19 Oct 2006, as part of Operation Mountain Fury, two ETTs (Embedded Training Teams) mentored and advised a D30 artillery section from Fourth Kandak, Second Brigade, 203rd Corps, to conduct the first artillery missions during combat operations with harassment and indirect fires. Three days later, they successfully conducted counterfire (with assistance from a US Q-36 radar) that resulted in ten enemy casualties, the highest casualties inflicted from artillery fire in ANA history. The corps is supported by the Gardez Regional Support Squadron of the AAF, equipped with 8 helicopters: 4 transport to support the corps' commando kandak, two attack, and two medical transport.
 205th Corps (Kandahar) – oversaw the provinces of Kandahar, Zabul, and 4th Brigade Urozgan under Brigadier General Zafar Khan's control. It consisted of four brigades, a commando kandak and three garrisons. The corps had integrated artillery and airlift capacity, supplied by a growing Kandahar Wing of the Afghan Air Force.
 207th Corps (Herat) – 1st Brigade at Herat, 2nd Brigade at Farah, and elements at Shindand (including commandos). The corps was supported by the Herat Regional Support Squadron of the AAF, equipped with eight helicopters: four transport to support the corps' commando kandak, two attack, and two medical transport aircraft.
 209th Corps (Mazar-i-Sharif) – Worked closely with the German-led Regional Command North, and had 1st Brigade at Mazar-i-Sharif and, it appears, a Second Brigade forming at Kunduz. An Army Corps of Engineers solicitation for Kunduz headquarters facilities for the Second Brigade was issued in March 2008. The corps was supported by the Mazar-i-Sharif Regional Support Squadron of the AAF, equipped with eight helicopters: four transport to support the Corps' commando kandak, two attack, and two medical transport helicopters. In October 2015, as a response to the fall of Kunduz, reports came that a new division would be formed in the area.
 215th Corps (Lashkar Gah) – In 2010, the Afghan government approved a sixth corps of the Afghan National Army – Corps 215 Maiwand – to be based in the Helmand capital of Lashkar Gah. The 215th was developed specifically to partner with the Marine Expeditionary Brigade in Helmand. On 28 January 2010, Xinhua reported that General Sayed Mallok would command the new corps. The corps will cover all parts of Helmand, half of Farah and most parts of southwestern Nimroz province. The corps was formally established on 1 April 2010. 1st Bde, 215th Corps, is at Garmsir, partnered with a USMC Regimental Combat Team. Elements of 2nd Brigade, 215th Corps, had been reported at Forward Operating Base Delaram, Farah Province. 3rd Bde, 215th Corps, partnered with the UK Task Force Helmand is at Camp Shorabak.
217th Corps (Headquarters Kunduz) In 2019, the 20th Division, which was formerly part of the 209th Corps, became the 217th Corps. The corps was given responsibility for Kunduz Province, Takhar, Baghlan, and Badakhshan provinces. In August 2021, the Taliban seized control of the corps headquarters and Kunduz as part of the 2021 Taliban offensive.
111th Capital Division – in late 2008 it was announced that the 201st Corps' former area of responsibility would be divided, with a Capital Division being formed in Kabul and the corps concentrating its effort further forward along the border. The new division, designated the 111th Capital Division, became operational in April 2009. It had a First Brigade and Second Brigade (both forming) as well as a Headquarters Special Security Brigade.

Most of the corps were retained, with their existing numerical designations, but renamed, in November 2021, after the Taliban seized power.

Other commands included:
ANA Special Operations Command – from mid-2011, the ANA began establishing a Special Operations Command to control the Commando Brigade and the ANA Special Forces. In July 2007 the ANA graduated its first commandos. The commandos underwent a grueling three-month course being trained by American special forces. They were fully equipped with US equipment and had received specialized light infantry training with the capability to conduct raids, direct action, and reconnaissance in support of counterinsurgency operations; they also provided a strategic response capability for the Afghan government.
Army Support Command, the ANA Recruiting Command, the Headquarters Security and Support Brigade (HSSB), and the Detainee Guard Force (as of 2011).
The ANA Ground Force Command was active . Under a lieutenant general it directed the regional ground forces corps and the 111th Capital Division. The Inspector General of the Department of Defense expressed concerns with the ANA Ground Force Command in these terms in March 2013, as the U.S. and allies: "began developing the Ground Forces Command in April 2009 and it is scheduled to achieve full operational capability for command and control of ANA forces by October 2012. However, it may take longer for the Ministry of Defense, General Staff, and some Corps Commanders to embrace this new organization. Several ANSF stakeholders expressed their belief that GFC was an unnecessary, intermediate layer of bureaucracy. A number of Afghan security officials conveyed doubts about the long-term existence of the GFC HQ after 2014." .."General Staff reluctance to identify and divest authorities and responsibilities to the GFC inhibited the timely development of the Ground Forces Command.  Afghan and Coalition officers also reported widespread, lukewarm support among senior level Ministry of Defense and General Staff officers for the establishment of the GFC. Operationally, some Afghan Corps commanders and staff members considered the GFC unnecessary and a redundant headquarters." The command was eventually disbanded in 2015; it was seen "by many as a redundant and unnecessary bureaucratic layer" between the General Staff and the regional corps.

Kandaks (battalions) 
The basic Afghan National Army unit was the kandak (battalion), consisting of 600 troops. Kandaks were made up of four companies (toli). Although the vast majority of kandaks were infantry, at least one mechanized and one tank kandak had been formed. Every ANA Corps was assigned commando kandaks.

Seven Quick Reaction Forces (QRF) kandaks were created in 2012–13, one kandak for each of the ANA's corps and divisions. They were created by converting existing infantry kandaks into QRF kandaks at the NMAA Armour Branch School. The QRF kandaks were trained and fielded in 2012 and 2013. The QRF kandaks were the first major ANA users of armoured vehicles.

As the ANA grew, the focus changed to further developing the force so that it could become self-sustaining. Development of Combat Support Kandaks [Battalions] (CSK) was vital to any self-sustainability. The CSK role includes motor fleet maintenance, specialized communications, scouting, engineering, and long range artillery units. While most ANA brigades had a CSK, they were underdeveloped and did not fit the requirements of a growing army. Eventually one fully developed CSK was planned to be assigned to each of the 24 army combat brigades. Each CSK included an Intelligence toli (company) called a Cashf Tolai. Each company was responsible for collecting information about the surrounding area and Taliban activities. The members of the unit interacted closely with the local residents in an effort to deny the enemy control over the surrounding area.

Combat service support was also vital. In order to enable the ANA to be self-sufficient, a Corps Logistics Kandak was to be formed which was to be responsible for providing equipment to the 90 infantry kandaks. The CLK was responsible for the maintenance of the new heavier equipment including APCs. In the 215th Corps area, the US Marine Combat Logistics Battalion 1 announced in January 2010 that the training of the ANA 5th Kandak, 1st Brigade, 215th ANA Corps Logistics Kandak has gone very well and that the unit was capable of undertaking the majority of day-to-day activities on their own. The ANA never achieved self-sufficiency and after losing logistical and air support from the U.S, the ANA fell apart during the 2021 Taliban offensive, making a series of negotiated surrenders.

Other forces 
The Afghan Border Force (ABF) was responsible for the security of Afghanistan's border area with neighboring countries extending up to  into the interior. In December 2017, most of the Afghan Border Police (ABP) personnel of the Afghan National Police were transferred to the Afghan National Army to form the ABF.| The Afghan National Police retained 4,000 ABP personnel for customs operations at border crossings and international airports. The ABF consisted of seven brigades.

The Afghan National Civil Order Force (ANCOF) was responsible for civil order and counterinsurgency. In March 2018, most of the Afghan National Civil Order Police (ANCOP) personnel of the Afghan National Police were transferred to the Afghan National Army to form the ANCOF with their role remaining the same. The remaining 2,550 ANCOP personnel in the Afghan National Police formed the Public Security Police (PSP). The ANCOF consisted of eight brigades. In June 2020, the ANCOF brigades began to be disbanded with personnel to be integrated into the Afghan National Army.

Collapse to Taliban in 2021 and reorganization 
Following the withdrawal of NATO troops from Afghanistan in the summer of 2021, in addition to a rapid offensive conducted by the Taliban, the Afghan National Army largely disintegrated, due to devastatingly low morale and massive corruption, with large numbers of ANA soldiers abandoning their posts or surrendering en masse to the Taliban, allowing the Taliban to capture large quantities of US-provided military equipment, vehicles and aircraft. Soon, all the regional forces of the ANA had dissolved, with the exception of the 201st Corps and the 111th Capital Division, both of which were headquartered in Kabul, which was now surrounded by the Taliban. On 15 August 2021, the Taliban entered the outskirts of Kabul from multiple directions, beginning the fall of Kabul. On the same day, President Ashraf Ghani fled the country to Dubai. It was reported that ANA soldiers were fleeing to neighbouring countries in droves, some on foot and others onboard Afghan Air Force aircraft. At 8:55 pm local time, Taliban forces seized the Arg and raised their flag, soon afterwards declaring the restoration of the Islamic Emirate of Afghanistan.

Following the fall of Kabul, the remaining forces of the ANA either deserted their posts or surrendered to the Taliban. Some remnants of the ANA regrouped in the Panjshir Valley, where they joined the anti-Taliban National Resistance Front of Afghanistan. Around 500–600 remaining Afghan troops, made up mostly of Afghan Commandos, were reported to have refused to surrender to the Taliban in Kabul, and instead joined up with US forces in at Kabul International Airport, helping them secure the outer perimeter of the airport during the evacuation in August 2021. According to Pentagon spokesman John Kirby, the US will evacuate these remaining Afghan troops to safety if they wish to leave Afghanistan when the evacuation operation ends.

Since the Taliban took control, there has been more than 100 former Afghan security forces who either disappeared, or were extrajudicially executed. These figures only cover four provinces, meaning the real number of former Afghan security forces disappearing or being executed may be much higher. Taliban soldiers have hunted down former Afghan security forces in the aftermath of the withdrawal.

 the Islamic Emirate Army is subdivided into eight corps, mostly superseding the previous corps of the Afghan National Army. They are listed below. In November 2021 Mullah Yaqoob, Acting Minister of Defense, announced the new names of the corps.

Army size 

A table of the size of the Afghan army over time is listed below.

Ranks 
Following the return of the Taliban into power, the Islamic Emirate Army continue to use the rank insignia of the Afghan National Army.
Commissioned officer ranks
The rank insignia of commissioned officers.

Other ranks
The rank insignia of non-commissioned officers and enlisted personnel.

Equipment 

The Afghan Army was equipped with the Soviet AK-47 as its main service rifle from the 1970s. As a major non-NATO ally of the United States, Afghanistan continued to receive billions of dollars in military assistance and the American M16 rifle joined the AK-47 as the service rifle. In addition, various U.S. rifles, bulletproof vests, night vision goggles, trucks and Mine Resistant Ambush-Protected vehicles entered service. The ANA previously had a contract with International Trucks that would provide a fleet of 2,781 trucks which could be used for transporting personnel, water, petroleum and as a recovery vehicle.

Besides NATO, Afghanistan had increasingly turned to its regional allies, India and Russia for military aid and supplies. Both countries supported the Northern Alliance, with funding, training, supplies and medical treatment of wounded fighters, against the Taliban for years prior to the US-led intervention in 2001.

After the removal of the Taliban government in late 2001, India invested several billion dollars in infrastructure development projects in Afghanistan, besides the training of Afghan officers in India. But India was unwilling to provide military aid unless under an UN-authorised peacekeeping mission. In 2014, India signed an agreement with Russia and Afghanistan where it would pay Russia for all the heavy equipment requested by Afghanistan instead of directly supplying them. The deal also includes the refurbishment of heavy weapons left behind since the Soviet war. Following the end of the 2021 Taliban offensive, much of the Afghan National Army's arsenal, including much of its U.S. military hardware, ended up in the hands of the Taliban.

See also 
Ethnic groups in Afghanistan

Notes

References 

   Self published English version of originally "Persian" work; see translator's note.
 
  (pages 323 onwards)
 
 
 
  288 pp.; £35.00. Due to its 'simplicity, which matched low technology and basic organization found among the human resources available' the Taliban's army from 1996 to 2001 was perhaps the most successful national army for Afghanistan (p. 121).
 
 
 
 
 
 
 
 
 
 
 </ref>

Further reading 
 Kenneth Conboy, 'Elite Forces of India and Pakistan,' – also covers Afghanistan, including post 1978 coup creation of 26th Parachute Regiment from two previous commando units.
 Yuri V. Gankovskii, Istoriia Vooruzhennykh Sil Afganistana: 1747–1977, Moscow: Nauka (also reported as Institut Vostokovedeniya), 1985.
 Antonio Giustozzi, 'Shadow Ownership and SSR in Afghanistan,' Chap. 11 in Tim Donnais (ed.) 'Local Ownership and Security Sector Reform,' DCAF/Lit Verlag, Zurich/Berlin, 2008 'Local Ownership.' Portrays a varying level of vested interest/warlord subversion of reform among the various security agencies; little local ownership at the MOD/ANA despite several attempts to seize more local control and subvert the foreign process by not proving enough personnel, imposing different officers, and wanting a conscript force. The army is financially unsustainable even at 70,000 strong and not being trained for combat in small units.
 Antonio Giustozzi, War, politics and society in Afghanistan, 1978–1992
 James Hardy, 'British MP urges changes to Afghan forces,' Jane's Defence Weekly, v.48, no.35, August 31, 2011, p. 15.
 Lieutenant Colonel Gavin Keating, 'Living in the Twilight Zone: Advising the Afghan National Army at the Corps Level' , Australian Army Journal, Vol. VIII, No. 3, Summer 2011.
 Maloney, Sean M. (2005), Enduring the Freedom: A Rogue Historian in Afghanistan, Washington, DC: Potomac Books, 
 Edward A Olsen, Stephen Jurika, The Armed Forces In Contemporary Asian Societies, Taylor and Francis, 2020.
 
 U.S. Army Area Handbook: Afghanistan, 1969, revised 1973
'US seeks to halve ANSF funds by 2014,' Jane's Defence Weekly, 5 October 2011. Reporting comments by Lt Gen Caldwell, Commander NATO Training Mission-Afghanistan (NTM-A), 26 September 2011.

External links 

 
 US Department of Defense, June 2018 'Enhancing Security and Stability in Afghanistan' report

Army of Afghanistan
Military units and formations established in the 1970s
Soviet foreign aid
Military units and formations of the War in Afghanistan (2001–2021)
A